Barbara Barone (born 21 August 1943) is a Chilean equestrian. She competed in the team jumping event at the 1972 Summer Olympics.

References

1943 births
Living people
Chilean female equestrians
Olympic equestrians of Chile
Equestrians at the 1972 Summer Olympics
Pan American Games medalists in equestrian
Pan American Games bronze medalists for Chile
Equestrians at the 1971 Pan American Games
Place of birth missing (living people)
Medalists at the 1971 Pan American Games
20th-century Chilean women